Jalen Nailor (born March 2, 1999), nicknamed "Speedy", is an American football wide receiver for the Minnesota Vikings of the National Football League (NFL). He played college football at Michigan State.

Early life and high school career 
Nailor attended Bishop Gorman High School in Las Vegas, Nevada. In high school, Nailor played football and ran track, winning four state titles. Nailor recorded 28 touchdowns and over 2,000 yards in his high school career including 12 touchdowns, 41 receptions, and 807 yards in his senior year. After originally being committed to Arizona State, Nailor decommited after Sun Devil's head coach Todd Graham was fired. Nailor, a three-star recruit, would instead chose to play at Michigan State University.

College career 
In his collegiate career, Nailor played in 28 games with Michigan State. Throughout his career, Nailor tallied stats of 86 receptions, 1,454 yards, and 12 touchdowns. 

In 2020, Nailor led the Big Ten in yards per catch while being the runner-up in 2021. 

In 2021, in a game against Rutgers, Nailor put up a career high 221 yards with three touchdowns. 

At the end of his collegiate career, Nailor declared for the 2022 NFL Draft.

Professional career

Minnesota Vikings
Nailor was drafted by the Minnesota Vikings in the sixth round (191st overall) of the 2022 NFL Draft.

In Week 4, against the New Orleans Saints, Nailor made his first career catch on a 13-yard fake punt from punter Ryan Wright, in the 28–25 win.

In Week 17, against the Green Bay Packers, Nailor recorded his first career touchdown reception, a 47-yard pass from Kirk Cousins. He finished the game with three catches for 89 yards.

References

External links 
 Minnesota Vikings bio
Michigan State Spartans bio

1999 births
Living people
Michigan State Spartans football players
American football wide receivers
Bishop Gorman High School alumni
People from Palmdale, California
Players of American football from California
Sportspeople from Los Angeles County, California
Minnesota Vikings players